Harshad Khadiwale (born 21 October 1988) is a cricketer who plays for Maharashtra in Indian domestic cricket. He is a right-hand opening batsman and a right arm medium-fast bowler. He also represents Pune Warriors in Indian Premier League.

Khadiwale made his debut for Maharashtra at the age of 18 against Hyderabad during the 2006/07 season. During that season, he made 198 runs from 6 innings at an average of 33, scoring two fifties. He scored his first first-class hundred against Tamil Nadu in the first match of the 2007/08 season. In the back of some good knocks for Maharashtra in the next season, he was picked in the West Zone squad for Duleep Trophy. Ever since, he has been the most consistent batsman for Maharashtra.

In 2011, he was contracted by the IPL franchise Pune Warriors.

References

External links 

Indian cricketers
Maharashtra cricketers
India Red cricketers
West Zone cricketers
1988 births
Living people